The Judiciary of Northern Cyprus is the system of courts which interprets and applies the law in Northern Cyprus. Judicial independence is safeguarded by the Constitution of the country.

Regulations applied in Northern Cyprus' courts are specified in Courts Law's 38th article. According to this article, the applied regulations are those: (a) Constitution of Northern Cyprus (b) regulations in force (as far as they do not violate the Constitution) (c) common law, i.e., judge-made law (as far as they do not violate the Constitution) (d) Evkaf Rules (e) regulations on Sea Law that was in execution on 21 December 1963.

Supreme Court
The Supreme Court is the highest court in Northern Cyprus.

District Courts
There are 5 district courts: 1. Lefkoşa (Nicosia) district court 2. Gazimağusa (Famagusta) district court 3. Girne (Kyrenia) district court 4. Güzelyurt (Morphou) district court 5. İskele (Trikomo) district court.

Immovable Property Commission
The Immovable Property Commission was set up under the Immovable Property Law (No. 67/2005) in accordance with the rulings of the European Court of Human Rights in the case of Xenides-Arestis v. Turkey. The purpose of this measure was to establish an effective domestic remedy for claims relating to abandoned properties in Northern Cyprus.

The decisions of the European Court of Human Rights on the validity of legal system of Northern Cyprus
The European Court of Human Rights (ECtHR) has made decisions on the validity of Northern Cyprus.

Necessity to exhaust all the remedies of the legal system of Northern Cyprus in order to apply ECtHR
On 2 July 2013, ECtHR decided that "...notwithstanding the lack of international recognition of the regime in the northern area, a de facto recognition of its acts may be rendered necessary for practical purposes. Thus, the adoption by the authorities of the "TRNC" of civil, administrative or criminal law measures, and their application or enforcement within that territory, may be regarded as having a legal basis in domestic law for the purposes of the Convention" In this ECtHR's decision, the case application of a Greek Cypriot was immediately rejected; i.e., his application was found inadmissible; he was rejected by ECtHR just at the beginning; therefore, his case was not handled (no sessions were held) by ECtHR at all.

The court system of TRNC was established by law with reference to the constitutional and legal basis on which it operated, and the courts of Northern Cyprus are independent and impartial
On 2 September 2015, ECtHR decided that "...the court system in the "TRNC", including both civil and criminal courts, reflected the judicial and common-law tradition of Cyprus in its functioning and procedures, and that the "TRNC" courts were thus to be considered as "established by law" with reference to the "constitutional and legal basis" on which they operated......the Court has already found that the court system set up in the "TRNC" was to be considered to have been "established by law" with reference to the "constitutional and legal basis" on which it operated, and it has not accepted the allegation that the "TRNC" courts as a whole lacked independence and/or impartiality......when an act of the "TRNC" authorities was in compliance with laws in force within the territory of northern Cyprus, those acts should in principle be regarded as having a legal basis in domestic law for the purposes of the convention.." Here, "laws in force within the territory of northern Cyprus" is the laws that TRNC published and put into implementation (See ECtHR's above 02.07.2013 decision).

References

See also

Government of Northern Cyprus
Law of Cyprus
Northern Cyprus